John H. Taylor may refer to:

John H. Taylor (Mormon) (1875–1946), leader in The Church of Jesus Christ of Latter-day Saints
John Henry Taylor (1871–1963), English golf pioneer
John H. Taylor (bishop), Episcopal bishop and chief of staff to former U.S. President Richard Nixon
John Henry Taylor, along with William John O'Meally, in 1958, became one of the last two people whipped in Australia

See also
John Taylor (disambiguation)